"Vapors" is a song co-written and performed by American hip hop musician Biz Markie, issued as the fifth single from his debut studio album Goin' Off. The song peaked at #80 on the Billboard R&B chart in 1988.

Music video

The music video was released in 1988 and it was directed by Lionel C. Martin.

Charts

Weekly charts

Snoop Doggy Dogg version

In 1997, American hip hop musician Snoop Doggy Dogg covered "Vapors" and included it on his second studio album Tha Doggfather. The song was issued as the second single from the album and it features vocals from Teena Marie and Charlie Wilson. In 2017, Snoop's version was remixed by DJ Battlecat for the former's fifteenth studio album Neva Left.

Music video

The official music video for the song was directed by Paul Hunter (under the pseudonym G. Thomas).

Chart positions

References

External links
 
 

1988 singles
1997 singles
Biz Markie songs
Cold Chillin' Records singles
Death Row Records singles
Music videos directed by Paul Hunter (director)
Music videos directed by Lionel C. Martin
Snoop Dogg songs
Teena Marie songs
Charlie Wilson (singer) songs
Song recordings produced by Marley Marl
Song recordings produced by DJ Pooh
Songs written by Snoop Dogg
Songs written by Big Daddy Kane
Songs written by Biz Markie
Songs written by Marley Marl
1988 songs